Lang Tzu-yun (5 April 1965) is a Taiwanese actress.

The company disbanded in 2008.

Selected filmography
The Candidate (1998)
Xiaoguang (2000)
Love in Disguise (2010)
Office Girls (2011)
Miss Rose (2012)
Big Red Riding Hood (2013)
Mr. Right Wanted (2014)
Sweet Alibis (2014)
Attention, Love! (2017)
Love, Timeless (2017)

References

1965 births
Living people
20th-century Taiwanese actresses
21st-century Taiwanese actresses
Taiwanese film actresses
Taiwanese television actresses
Taiwanese xiangsheng performers
Manchu actresses
Taiwanese people of Manchu descent